Pasjak is a village in Croatia, located on the border with Slovenia. Just north of the village is the northern endpoint of the D8 highway, at the eponymous Pasjak border crossing. The village is part of the Matulji municipality.

References

Populated places in Primorje-Gorski Kotar County
Croatia–Slovenia border crossings